Frank Sound Forest lies near the southern coast of the East End district of Grand Cayman, one of the Cayman Islands, a British Overseas Territory in the Caribbean Sea. It is one of the territory's Important Bird Areas (IBAs).

Description
Frank Sound Forest is a 223 ha tract of native tropical dry forest surrounding Queen Elizabeth II Botanic Park. it is privately owned, unprotected and is subject to fragmentation and clearance for agricultural and urban development.

Birds
The IBA was identified as such by BirdLife International because it supports populations of Cuban amazons, Caribbean elaenias, thick-billed vireos, Yucatan vireos and vitelline warblers.

References

Important Bird Areas of the Cayman Islands
Tropical and subtropical dry broadleaf forests
Grand Cayman